The Plesná is a river of the Czech Republic (Karlovy Vary Region) and Germany (Saxony). Its source is located near Horní Paseky, on the southern slope of the Stráž mountain in the Fichtel Mountains. It crosses the Czech-German border into Germany and then re-enters Czech Republic near Bad Brambach. Its confluence with Ohře lies southwest of Nebanice.

See also
List of rivers of the Czech Republic
List of rivers of Saxony

Rivers of the Karlovy Vary Region
Rivers of Saxony
Rivers of Germany
International rivers of Europe